Emerald City is the seventh album by Teena Marie, released on July 22, 1986. It is a stylistic departure for her, with strong blues and rock influences favored over her established soul/funk style, and is a concept album. This proved puzzling for fans and critics, and the album sold poorly, peaking at #20 on the US Black Albums chart and #81 on the Billboard Albums chart.

Two singles, "Lips to Find You" and "Love Me Down Easy", were released. They reached #28 and #76 respectively on the Black Singles chart, but neither charted on the Billboard Hot 100. However, "Shangri-La", while it never became a single or charted anywhere, became a staple of Quiet storm programming blocks on adult R&B radio.

Stevie Ray Vaughan played the guitar solo on "You So Heavy", Bootsy Collins provided vocals on the title album track, and Stanley Clarke provided bass on "Sunny Skies".

The album has been reissued by SoulMusic Records in 2012, with 5 bonus tracks.

Track listing
All songs written by Teena Marie, except where noted.

"Emerald City" - 4:10
"Once Is Not Enough" - 5:47
"Lips to Find You" (Bendrix, Marie) - 5:11
"You So Heavy" (Marie, Penny "P.J." Johnson) - 5:07
"Shangri-La" (Marie, Johnson) - 5:04
"Batucada Suite" - 5:06
"Love Me Down Easy" - 5:24
"Sunny Skies" - 7:14
Bonus tracks - 2012 SoulMusic reissue
"Lips To Find You" (US Instrumental) - Expanded Edition
"Love Me Down Easy" (US 12” single) - Expanded Edition
"Love Me Down Easy" (US Instrumental 12” single) - Expanded Edition
"14K" (track from "The Goonies" soundtrack) - Expanded Edition
"Lead Me On" (track from the "Top Gun" soundtrack) - Expanded Edition

External links

Teena Marie albums
1986 albums
Epic Records albums